Robert Broughton may refer to:

 Robert Broughton (activist) (born 1950), Canadian cycling activist
 Robert Broughton (cricketer) (1816–1911), English amateur cricketer
 Robert Broughton (MP) (died 1506), landowner, soldier and Member of Parliament for Suffolk